Hsieh Chang-heng (born 22 January 1962) is a pitcher in the CPBL. He played for Uni-President Lions. He is the 1st person achieved the record of career with 100 wins. After retired, he became the manager of the Lions and then Chinatrust Whales until it went defunct in 2008.

References

1962 births
Living people
Uni-President Lions players
Baseball players from Tainan
Baseball pitchers
Uni-President 7-Eleven Lions managers
Chinatrust Whales managers
Brother Elephants managers
CTBC Brothers managers